Leptolaelaps is a genus of mites in the family Leptolaelapidae. There are about five described species in Leptolaelaps.

Species
These five species belong to the genus Leptolaelaps:
 Leptolaelaps capensis Evans, 1957
 Leptolaelaps lambda Evans, 1957
 Leptolaelaps lawrencei Evans, 1957
 Leptolaelaps longicornea Karg, 1978
 Leptolaelaps reticulatus Evans, 1957

References

Mesostigmata
Articles created by Qbugbot